Jerry Lee Atwood (born September 13) is an American fashion designer specializing in western wear and chainstitch embroidery. Atwood was featured in the February 2021 issue of Vogue.

Union Western 
Union Western Clothing is featured in the documentary, Chain Stitched: The Work of Jerry Lee Atwood from Grass Fed Cinema in 2018. The Highwomen wear Union Western originals on their album cover, along with singer Joshua Hedley, Foo Fighters guitarist Chris Shiflett, and other country stars including Nikki Lane.

Lil Nas X 
In 2012, Atwood designed the suit worn by Lil Nas X in the "Old Town Road" video with Billy Ray Cyrus.

Post Malone 
Grammy Award winner Post Malone wore a Union Western suit to the 2018 American Music Awards.

References 

Year of birth missing (living people)
Living people
American fashion designers
Place of birth missing (living people)